Kiko and the Honey Bears is a 1936 traditionally animated buddy comedy short film created at Terrytoons, and distributed by 20th Century Fox. It is the second film to feature Kiko the Kangaroo as well as the character's first solo short film.

Plot
When a mother bear gets burdened by the pesky antics of her cubs, she places a sign in front of her house to hire a caretaker. Immediately Kiko, who is passing by, reads the ad and takes the job.

Kiko plays with the cubs in the woods. The ways he assists them include being their diving board and seesaw. After such a play, Kiko takes a nap under a tree. Moments later, a hunter and pack of hounds come to the woods. The cubs attempt to run and hide from their pursuers. When the hunter fires a gun, Kiko is awakened and very surprised. Kiko brawls with the hunter and the hounds, knocking the pursuers out of the scene. He then takes the cubs and leaves.

Kiko returns to the home of the cubs, much to the delight of the mother bear. Singing in the melody of Kiko's theme song, the cubs tell their mother how Kiko saved them in the woods.

References

External links

 

1936 films
1936 short films
1936 comedy films
1936 animated films
1930s American animated films
1930s children's animated films
1930s animated short films
1930s buddy comedy films
1930s English-language films
American children's animated comedy films
American animated short films
American buddy comedy films
American slapstick comedy films
American black-and-white films
Animated buddy films
Terrytoons shorts
Animated films about kangaroos and wallabies
Animated films about bears
Animated films about children
Films about hunters
Animated films about dogs
Talking animals in fiction
Animated films about friendship
Animated films set in the United States
Films set in forests
Films set in 1936
Spring (season) in culture
Films directed by George Gordon
Films directed by Mannie Davis
20th Century Fox short films